Slovenia selected their first Junior Eurovision Song Contest 2014 entry through an internal selection. On 16 September 2014 it was revealed that Ula Ložar would represent Slovenia after having open auditions.

Before Junior Eurovision

Internal selection
After much speculation, on 19 August 2014 Vladislav Yakovlev revealed on his Twitter account that Slovenia would make their debut in the 2014 contest. The next day, the Slovene broadcaster RTVSLO announced that they would select their participant internally though the broadcaster's Children and Entertainment Departments. On 16 September 2014, the broadcaster revealed that 12-year-old Ula Ložar had been selected to represent the country in Marsa, Malta.

At Junior Eurovision 
At the running order draw which took place on 9 November 2014, Slovenia were drawn to perform ninth on 15 November 2014, following  and preceding . Slovenia finished 12th in the final with 29 points, despite being one of the favourites to win the contest.

Voting

Detailed voting results
The Slovenian votes in this final were based on 100% jury. The following members comprised the Slovene jury:
 Irena Vrčkovnik
 Urša Vlašič
 Anže Langus Petrović
 Eva Černe
 Alex Volasko

Notes

References

Junior Eurovision Song Contest
Slovenia
Junior